Estonian Modern Pentathlon Association (abbreviation EMPA) is one of the sport governing bodies in Estonia which deals with modern pentathlon.

EMPA is established on 20 April 1990 in Tallinn. EMPA is a member of International Modern Pentathlon Union (UIPM).

References

External links
 

Sports governing bodies in Estonia
Modern pentathlon in Estonia
National members of the Union Internationale de Pentathlon Moderne
Sports organizations established in 1990